The 1929 WAFL season was the 45th season of the West Australian Football League in its various incarnations.

East Fremantle proved the outstanding team, and won the second of what would become seven successive minor premierships and four successive flags. Subiaco denied a Perth club bolstered by the return as coach of Jack Leckie – who had masterminded their pre-war successes including their only premiership to that point – its first finals appearance since 1920 with a convincing last round win. Claremont-Cottesloe won more games than in its first three seasons combined and a brilliant mid-season burst looked to assure it of a finals berth before a September fade-out – but the Great Depression and the financial power of several wealthy VFL clubs prevented the Tigers sustaining this improvement.

Following the death in a truck accident of champion coach Phil Matson, an upheaval off the field during the summer, and the retirement of numerous top players of their 1920s dynasty such as Bonny Campbell, Val Sparrow (who took to coaching the club), “Paddy” Hebbard, Joe O'Meara and Jack Walsh, former powerhouse East Perth suffered its first wooden spoon since 1913 and lost a club record fifteen consecutive matches. The Royals were also affected by injuries to remaining key players Owens and Fletcher, who missed several games and were never fully fit.

Sol Lawn of South Fremantle beat the record of Bonny Campbell for most goals in a WAFL season, finishing with ninety-six.

Home-and-away season

Round 1

Round 2

Round 3

Round 4

Round 5

Round 6

Round 7 (Foundation Day)

Round 8

Round 9

Round 10

Round 11

Round 12

Round 13

Round 14

Round 15

Round 16

Round 17

Round 18

Round 19

Round 20

Round 21

Ladder

Finals

First semi-final

Second semi-final

Grand Final

Notes
Awarded retrospectively in 1997 after losing on casting vote.The other competing clubs’ first 20-goal scores were: Perth – 25.24 (174) v Subiaco in 1904; East Fremantle – 21.11 (137) v Midland Junction in 1905; Subiaco – 20.15 (135) v West Perth in 1913; South Fremantle – 22.15 (147) v Midland Junction in 1916; East Perth – 21.8 (134) v West Perth in 1926. North Fremantle kicked its only 20-goal score of 25.24 (174) against Subiaco as early as 1902, whilst West Perth was to score its first in 1933.

References

External links
Official WAFL website
West Australian Football League (WAFL) 1929

West Australian Football League seasons
WAFL